Lichter der Stadt (German for City Lights) is the eighth album by the Neue Deutsche Härte band Unheilig. It was released on March 16, 2012. It reached gold status, with 100,000 copies sold, in just 3 days.

Track listing

Limited Edition Track Listing

Certifications and sales

Lichter Der Stadt Tour 2012
June, 30 - Meppen, Germany - MEP-Arena
July, 1 - Freiburg, Germany - XXX Lutz Freiburg
July, 6 - Magdeburg, Germany - Rothehornpark
July, 7 - Flensburg, Germany - Campushalle
July, 13 - Leipzig, Germany - Völkerschlacht-Denkmal
July, 14 - Nürnburg, Germany - Zeppelinfeld Nürnberg
July, 15 - Locarno, Switzerland - Moon & Stars Festival
July, 20 - Stuttgart, Germany - Cannstatter Wasen
July, 21 - Köln, Germany -Rhein-Energie-Stadion
July, 27 - Hannover, Germany - EXPO Plaza
July, 28 - Rostock, Germany - IGA Park
August, 4 - Zwickau, Germany - Flugplatz
August, 5 - Passau, Germany - Dreiländerhalle
August, 10 - Saarbrücken, Germany - Messe
August, 11 - Hemer, Germany - Sauerlandpark
August, 17 - Essen, Germany - Gruga Halle
August, 18 - Weilburg, Germany - Festplatz
August, 24 - Graz, Austria - Messe
August, 25 - Linz, Austria - TipsArena
August, 26 - Vienna, Austria - Stadthalle
September, 1 - Berlin, Germany - Kindl-Bühne Wuhlheide (Sold Out)
September, 2 - Berlin, Germany - Kindl-Bühne Wuhlheide
September, 9 - München, Germany - Messe München-Riem
October, 21 - Frankfurt, Germany - Festhalle
November, 7 - Vienna, Austria - Ronacher
November, 11 - Dortmund, Germany - Westfalenhalle
November, 13 - Aschheim, Germany - XXXLutz
November, 23 - Köln, Germany - Lanxess Arena
November, 24 - Halle/Westf, Germany - Gerry Weber Stadion
December, 8 - Saalbach, Austria - Snow Mobile 2012

2013 Lichter der Stadt II - Letzter Halt Tour

February, 9 - Hamburg, Germany - O2 World Hamburg (Sold Out)
February, 22 - Erfurt, Germany - Messehalle
February, 23 - Chemnitz, Germany - Chemnitz Arena
March, 2 - Kempton, Germany - BigBox
March, 3 - Zürich, Switzerland - Hallenstadion (Sold Out)
March, 7 - Augsburg, Germany - Schwabenhalle
March, 8 - Salzburg, Austria - Salzburg Arena
April, 19 - Trier, Germany - Arena Trier
April, 20 - Frankfurt, Germany - Festhalle
May, 10 - Braunschweig, Germany - VW Halle (Sold Out)
May, 11 - Dortmund, Germany - Westfalenhalle
May, 18 - Laboe, Germany - Kurstrand
June, 21 - Kassel, Germany - Auestadion
June, 22 - Halle (Saal), Germany - Freilichtbühne Peißnitz
June, 29 - München, Germany - Tollwood Sommer Festival
July, 18 - Emmendingen, Germany - Schlossplatz
July, 19 - Straubing, Germany - Bluetone Festival
July, 20 - Dresden, Germany - Elbufer
July, 24 - Salem, Germany - Schloss Salem
July, 27 - Mannheim, Germany - Schloss Mannheim
July, 28 - Ludwigsburg, Germany - Residenzschloss
August, 2 - Refnitz, Austria - Festplatz
August, 3 - Tulln, Austria - Donaubühne
August, 9 - Munster, Germany - Schlossplatz
August, 11 - Zofingen, Switzerland - Heitere Open Air
August, 16 - Oldenburg, Germany - Freigelände an der Weser-Ems-Halle
August, 17 - St. Goarshausen / Loreley, Germany - Loreley Freilichtbühne
August, 18 - Norderney, Germany - Summertime at Norderney
August, 31 - Cottbus, Germany - Spreeauenpark
September, 7 - Mönchengladbach, Germany - Warsteiner Hockey Park
September, 9 - Berlin, Germany - IFA Sommergarten - Messe.

Clubshows 2012
February, 18 - Bremen, Germany - Pier2
February, 19 - Düsseldorf, Germany - Stahlwerk 
February, 20 - Dresden, Germany - Alter Schlachthof

References

Unheilig albums
2012 albums
Vertigo Records albums
German-language albums